Ivan Akimovich Lychev (30 May 1881 – 16 November 1972) was a Soviet politician. He was a member of the Central Control Commission of the 15th Congress of the All-Union Communist Party (Bolsheviks). He served as Administrator of Affairs (1935–1938) of the Central Committee of the 17th Congress. He was a recipient of the Order of Lenin.

Bibliography
Воспоминания потёмкинца. М.,Л., 1925.
Мятеж на «Потёмкине». Самара, 1925.
Потёмкинцы. Хабаровск, 1935.
Потёмкинцы. Минск, 1936.
Потёмкинцы. Восспоминания участника восстания на броненосце «Князь *Потёмкин-Таврический». М., 1937.
Потёмкинцы. Воспоминания о восстании на броненосце «Князь Потёмкин-*Таврический». М., 1954.
Подготовка и восстание на броненосце «Потёмкин» // Военные моряки в *период первой русской революции 1905—1907 гг. М. 1955.
Годы борьбы. Записки старого большевика. Куйбышев. 1957.
Потёмкинцы. М., 1965.

Works
Кардашев Ю. П. Восстание. Броненосец «Потёмкин» и его команда. — Москва, 2008, .
Лычев Иван Акимович — статья из Большой советской энциклопедии

External links
 Справочник по истории Коммунистической партии и Советского Союза 1898—1991 на knowbysight.info

1881 births
1972 deaths
Soviet politicians
Recipients of the Order of Lenin